Evalljapyx is a genus of diplurans in the family Japygidae.

Species

 Evalljapyx adonis Smith, 1960
 Evalljapyx aguayoi Silvestri, 1929
 Evalljapyx anombris Smith, 1960
 Evalljapyx bolivari Silvestri, 1948
 Evalljapyx boneti Silvestri, 1948
 Evalljapyx brevipalpus Silvestri, 1911
 Evalljapyx bruneri Silvestri, 1929
 Evalljapyx costaricanus Silvestri, 1948
 Evalljapyx crassicauda Silvestri, 1929
 Evalljapyx cubanus Silvestri, 1929
 Evalljapyx decorus Smith, 1960
 Evalljapyx dispar Silvestri, 1948
 Evalljapyx diversipleura Silvestri, 1911
 Evalljapyx dolichodduus Silvestri, 1911
 Evalljapyx euryhebdomus Silvestri, 1911
 Evalljapyx facetus Smith, 1959
 Evalljapyx furciger Silvestri, 1911
 Evalljapyx helferi Smith, 1959
 Evalljapyx heterurus Silvestri, 1911
 Evalljapyx hubbardi (Cook, 1899)
 Evalljapyx leechi Smith, 1960
 Evalljapyx leleuoporum Paclt, 1976
 Evalljapyx limpia Muegge, 2004
 Evalljapyx macswaini Smith, 1960
 Evalljapyx mckenziei Smith, 1960
 Evalljapyx newelli Smith, 1960
 Evalljapyx ombris Smith, 1960
 Evalljapyx propinquus Silvestri, 1911
 Evalljapyx raneyi Smith, 1959
 Evalljapyx saundersi Pagés, 1996
 Evalljapyx sonoranus Silvestri, 1911
 Evalljapyx subinermis Silvestri, 1929
 Evalljapyx vicinior Silvestri, 1948

References

Diplura